The California School for the Blind is a public educational institution for blind children, K-12, located in Fremont, California. Its campus is located next to the California School for the Deaf.

History 
The San Francisco area's education of blind children began in 1860 with the organization of the privately supported Society for the Instruction and Maintenance of the Indigent Deaf and Dumb, and the Blind in California by Mrs. Frances Clark. She served as the first principal of the school until 1865, when Dr. Warring Wilkinson was brought to the school. Dr. Wilkinson is credited with beginning the efforts to make the school wholly state-supported and seeing the school, then known as the California State Asylum for the Deaf, Dumb and Blind through its move to what would later become Berkeley in 1867.

A 1906 amendment to the Political Code changed the school's name to the California Institution for the Deaf and Blind and established the school's place as a part of the California State school system. Dr. Wilkinson retired in 1910. The Legislature voted in 1914 to substitute the term "School" for "Institution," again changing the school's name, this time to the California School for the Deaf and Blind.

The school was separated by a legislative act in 1922 into separate programs, the California School for the Blind (CSB) and the California School for the Deaf, although formal separation with the completion of a new classroom building did not occur until July 1929. California School for the Blind was given authorization by the state legislature in 1943 to admit the deaf-blind, becoming the third school in the country to establish a deaf-blind program. The first deaf-blind student to graduate from CSB was graduated in 1949.

The school's enrollment peaked in 1965 at 167 students. By 1973, the California Department of Education determined that the school needed to be relocated to a site more amenable to meeting accessibility for students with limited mobility and updating facilities to meet current earthquake and fire code standards. A new campus was constructed in Fremont, California and the school moved to its current home there in 1980.

The school is a member of Council of Schools for the Blind (COSB).

Campus 
The Fremont campus has dormitory facilities.

Berkeley (1867–1980) 

The first building on the Berkeley campus was a stone Victorian Gothic building which was constructed starting in 1867.  This construction was interrupted when major damage was caused as a result of the 1868 Hayward earthquake.  Construction was subsequently completed and the site opened for classes.  Another disaster struck in January 1875 when a fire destroyed the same building. Classes continued in temporary buildings for a few years while new buildings were constructed, including an educational building, four dormitories, various support facilities and a private residence for the principal. In 1890, the Spanish Colonial Revival education building was completed, featuring an assembly hall and a  tower with a Seth Thomas clock. The education building survived the 1906 San Francisco earthquake with damage to some chimneys and the slate roof as well as interior cracks, but there was no fire and the main walls held firm.

Additional buildings were erected over the years: a gymnasium in 1915, a girls' dormitory in 1925, a boys' dormitory and another classroom building in 1929, a wing added to the new classroom building in 1931, the Helen Keller Building for classes for the deaf-blind in 1949, and a new dining facility in 1957. Ms. Keller was present at the dedication of the building named in her honor.

During the 1970s, a new site was constructed in Fremont and the school's move there was completed in 1980. In 1981 the Berkeley campus was designated a Berkeley Landmark. In 1982, it was placed on the National Register of Historic Places. The school's former site was divided between the University of California and the city of Berkeley. Both parties opened their portions of the site in 1986, the university as the Clark Kerr Campus residential complex and the city as Redwood Gardens, a home for financially needy elderly people.

Curriculum 
The school follows a nationally accepted expanded core curriculum for students who are blind or visually impaired. It includes skills training in braille reading and writing, orientation and mobility, assistive technology, career education, adapted physical education, music, art, recreation and leisure, independent living, and functional academics.

Extracurricular activities 
Popular activities among California School for the Blind students include swimming, karate, goalball, tandem bicycling, music groups, dance groups, international pen pals on tape, art, cooking and roller skating. Many of the school's athletes are also members of the Alameda County Special Olympics team and the United States Association of Blind Athletes.

Notable alumni 

Dr. Newel Perry, founder of the California Council of the Blind, one of the original seven state organizations at the creation of the National Federation of the Blind
Matilda Allison (1888–1973), blind educator, stenographer
Christine la Barraque (–1961), singer, first blind woman admitted to the bar in California
Kate M. Foley (1873–1940), librarian, worked on blind literacy in California

References

External links
 California School for the Blind
 Photograph c.1890 by Edward Muybridge, NY Public Library
Guide to the Warring Wilkinson Papers, (ca. 1875-1911) at The Bancroft Library

Public boarding schools in the United States
Boarding schools in California
Schools for the blind in the United States
Schools in Fremont, California
High schools in Alameda County, California
National Register of Historic Places in Berkeley, California
School buildings on the National Register of Historic Places in California
Public K-12 schools in California
Historic districts on the National Register of Historic Places in California
1860 establishments in California